Pushpadana Girls' College is public girls' schools located in Kandy, Sri Lanka.

History

 31 May 1941 – The idea of establishing a school to provide English education to Buddhist girls was born out of a speech made by E. W. Adhikaram at the 34th Anniversary Meeting of the Sri Pushpadana Society, Kandy.

 2 July 1942 – Established as a learning institution for Buddhist girls in a small building around Kandy by "Sri Pushpadana Samithiya" housed in Trincomalee Street of Kandy city. The school was inaugurated by the then Minister of Health, Hon. George E. de Silva. The founding principal was Mrs. Chlora Dias Wijetilleke, then the Chairman of the Sri Pushpadana Society. as well as wife of Attorney-at-Law S. A. Wijethilake. She was a first class English teacher and started the school with a staff of six and three students. The alphabet was read to the first three students by the then Hon. Minister of Education, C. W. W. Kannangara.

 2 July 1943 – The school held its first anniversary celebration.

 6 May 1946 – The school, which had five staff members, including the principal, and 128 students, became a government school after being handed over to the then Director of Education, Ian Sandiman.

 22 June 1953 – became a government school under the first principal Mrs. S. A. Wijetillekesiri.

 2 July 1953 – After being a major government school, school was shifted to the present day premises with 11 staff of teachers and 400 students during the tenure of the Principal P. D. S. Kularatne. Later this day was named as the day of commemoration of the founding fathers of the school.

 1953 – The College Girl Scout Movement was started with the contribution of Rani Abeyratne.

 From 3 May 1954 – 28 November 1958: Mrs. W. M. M. de Silva was appointed as the principal of the school. Under her period, the school set up the four school houses with school's first sports meet. The school also introduced a new school uniform and started scouting in the school.

 From 1 January 1959 – 1 September 1961: Mrs. Hemamala Swarnalatha Jayasinghe became the school's principal. A Buddha shrine, a teachers-parents union, advanced levels and the school's first prize giving are the major developments under her period. 

 1 September 1961 – While working as an assistant teacher, Mrs. Subhadra Siriwardena has taken over as the Acting Principal of the school. She has the honor to hold the first prize giving ceremony of the school on 11th November 1961. Also, various activities have been initiated for the students to adapt the celebration of Atasil for the Vesak Poya to a Buddhist environment.

 From 13 December 1961 – 30 July 1963: Mrs. Vishaka Gunethilake became the principal. The school's motto has been made as "Charithayen Nuwana Bebale", meaning "Wisdom shines through character", and school anthem vocalized for the first time. The school also started Dharma schools which is held in every Sunday.

 From 31 July 1963 – 1 May 1965: Mrs. Rathwatte Gnanasekaram became the principal. During her period, extra-curriculars started. Under her leadership, the prize giving ceremony for the year 1963 was held on 2 December 1964 under the patronage of the then Prime Minister of Sri Lanka, Hon. Sirimavo Bandaranaike. 

 From 1 May 1965 – 8 September 1980: Mrs. Hema de Seram became the principal. She started Western music band, an Eastern music band of the school. In 1971, GCE A/L Science curriculum commenced, the opening of a dental clinic, the opening of the hockey and the creation of a school library were some of the important services that took place during this period. The Alumni Association was established in the year 1972 to support the development of the school. With the increase in the number of students in the school, as there was not enough space in the building, the primary classes (1971 - 1 Grades, 1972 - 2 Grades, 1973 - 3 Grades, 1974 - 4 Grades, 1975 - 5 Grades) were removed and in 1975 the school was converted into a secondary school with classes from grade six upwards.

 From 1980 to 2002: Mrs. G. K. Alahakoon Dassanayake became the principal. She has been the Principal of the school for the longest time. Under her tenure, activities such as conducting English pronunciation classes to teach students English, teaching subjects in English, giving opportunities to enjoy English drama and giving the opportunity to read daily English newspapers were initiated. Also, under her leadership, I. Mrs. Godigamuwa translated the school anthem into English and directed it to be sung in the morning, creating student pledges. In the 1990s, students were given the opportunity to learn various languages such as French, Japanese and Tamil, and the teaching of aesthetics and agricultural streams for the Advanced Level began. In the same time, the school was promote to a national school with effect from 5th February 1993. Meanwhile, student hostel was opened and Principal's Official Residence was constructed. In her late years, school started English medium section in 2002 with grade 6 students.

 From 4 March 2002 – 16th August 2002: After the retirement of Dasanayake, Miss. M. R. Amarasekera has served as the Acting Principal.

 From September 2002 – September 2009: Mrs. W. D. P. K. Samarasinghe became the principal. Her tenure is considered as the limelight of school's sports and educational achievements. She is notable for: holding the school's first Color Awards Ceremony in 2003, streamlining the school plant and activities through the 'S-5' concept, Winning the Central Province Governor's Trophy by winning the Central Province First Place in the 'Api Wawamu Rata Nagamu' Program 2007, and Winning the Kandy District First Place and All Island Bronze Award in 2008 at the Competition on 'Best Annual Report and Financial Publications Among National Schools'. The Air Cadet Corps, Prefect Training Camp as well as Cricket were started during this period to develop social skills in the students. With 2008 GCE A/L, the teaching of approved subjects in the Arts and Commerce streams began to be taught in English medium. During her late years, the school won Kandy District second place and All Island Bronze (shared) Award for Report 2009 in the 'Annual Report and Financial Publications between National Schools' Competition jointly organized by the Ministry of Education and AAT. 

 From 2009 to 2019 - Mrs. G. W. L. K Egodawela was the principal. During her period, the school won Kandy District First Place and All Island Gold Award for the year 2010 report as well as Kandy District First Place and All Island Bronze Award for Report 2011 and Kandy District Second Place and Central Provincial First Place for Report 2012. Then the school won the All Island Platinum Award for Report 2013, Central Province First Place for 2014 Report (Co) and Central Provincial First Place for 2016 Report. In 2016, the 'Diya Keliya' dance and the 'Naga Kanya' solo dance presented at the 2016 All Island Dance Competition won the first place. In 2017, the school became the winners of the 'Danumai Wasanawai' Quiz Tournament in the Kandy District sponsored by DSI Super Sports. At the same time, Pushpadana won the First place in the All Ceylon Air Cadet Assessment Camp in the year 2016 and second place in the year 2017.

Achievements
 In 2015, the school won the Kandy District Girls under 19 schools basketball Championship.
 In 2017, Under-14 hockey team won the ‘Golden Star’ award at the 17th Sri Lanka Schools Hockey Carnival 2017.
 In 2020, Ruchini Niwarthana won third Place of Sri Lankan Biology Olympiad 2020.

Education
There are about 2,000 students and 130 teachers. Therevada Buddhism has largely been an integral part of the school's education system, as it is in all Sri Lankan Buddhist public schools. The students for the school are selected mainly through grade 5 scholarship programme. Grades are from 6 to 13. The school provides all A/L disciplines from Science stream to Technology Stream.

In 2015, Nirasha Nadeeshani Kularatne won the All Island second place in the Arts stream according to the results of the GCE (A/L) examination. In 2016, according to the results of the GCE (O/L) examination, Pushpadana won the Kandy District first place, the Central Province the second place and the All Island the fourth place. Also, the percentage qualified for GCE (A/L) was 100% and the overall percentage in all subjects was 100%. According to the GCE (A/L) results of the years 2015 and 2016, the School won the first places in both the streams of Biosystems Technology and Engineering Technology.

Past principals

Houses
The students are divided into four Houses:

 –  Sangamiththa
 –  Yasodhara
 –  Chithra
 –  Gothami

The house names are derived from Buddhist history. The houses compete annually in all major games to win inter-house games and competitions.

Notable alumni

 Chandrika Siriwardena, singer
 Nadeeka Gunasekara, actress

References

External links
Annual Commerce Day of Pushpadana Girls' College
Pushpadana Girls' College
NCC Air Wing Cadets of Pushpadana Girls' College 

National schools in Sri Lanka
Buddhist schools in Sri Lanka
Schools in Kandy
Girls' schools in Sri Lanka
Educational institutions established in 1942
1942 establishments in Ceylon